Genç is a town in Bingöl Province in Turkey. It is the seat of Genç District. Its population is 20,763 (2021). The mayor is Mehmet Zeki Dirik (AKP).

The town is populated by Kurds.

Neighborhoods
The town is divided into the neighborhoods of Cumhuriyet, Kültür, Yenişehir, Yeşildere and Yoldaşan.

Population
The population of Genç district was 35,208 in 2011, of which 19,123 live in the city itself.

References

External links 
  official website of the municipality of Genç

Populated places in Bingöl Province
Genç District
Towns in Turkey
Kurdish settlements in Bingöl Province